The Meny-X, also known as Maniacs Records, is a German rap and R&B record label based in Pulheim. The front rappers and label leaders are Conik, King Flow, Q and Maruf-T.

See also
 List of record labels

German record labels
Contemporary R&B record labels